Vahdat or Vakhdat (formerly: Ovchi) is a jamoat in north-west Tajikistan. It is located in Devashtich District in Sughd Region. The jamoat has a total population of 31,955 (2015). It consists of 8 villages, including Qal'ai Mirzoboy (the seat) and Basmanda.

Notes

References

Populated places in Sughd Region
Jamoats of Tajikistan